Patrizia Dorsch (born 15 February 1994) is a German World Cup alpine ski racer, and specializes in the speed events of Downhill and Super-G.

Born in Berchtesgaden, Bavaria, Dorsch made her World Cup debut in December 2013 and her best World Cup result is a fifth place in a combined event at Crans-Montana in 2019.

World Cup results

Season standings

Top ten finishes

 0 podiums; 1 top ten

References

External links

 
 Patrizia Dorsch World Cup standings at the International Ski Federation 
 
 Patrizia Dorsch at German Ski Team (DSV) official site 

German female alpine skiers
1994 births
Living people
People from Berchtesgaden
Sportspeople from Upper Bavaria
21st-century German women